Baba Bhaskar  is an Indian dance choreographer, director and actor who works mainly in Tamil and Telugu language films in addition to some Hindi, Malayalam, Kannada films.

Career 

He was born and brought up in Chennai. Due to his interest in dance, he started learning dance through Paulraj, and later he started working as an assistant for Shiva Shankar Master for several years. And later, he worked as a dance assistant under well-known choreographer Raju Sundaram Master for 5 years. 

Shiva Shankar Master and Raju Sundaram Master taught him about cinema choreography and how a song should be choreographed says Baba Bhaskar master in an interview. He started his film career as a background dancer and he has been seen in many Tamil and Telugu films. His long-time wish is to become a successful choreographer in the film industry. And it happened through a Telugu film Kotha Bangaru Lokam which was released way back in 2008. His choreography in the movie got attention and later he turns into a choreographer in the Tamil film industry too.

He started as choreographer in Tamil film through the movie Kedi which offered him great recognition. Through Kedi movie, he gets a chance to choreograph with the leading actors in the Tamil film industry like Rajinikanth, Vijay, Ajith Kumar, Suriya, Dhanush, Siddharth, Karthi, Vijay Sethupathi, Prabhu Deva, Vishal and in Telugu Film industry he worked with many leading actors like Nagarjuna , Mahesh Babu , Ram Charan , Varun Sandesh and more. After working as a choreographer for several films including Singam (2010), Bhaskar made his directorial debut with Kuppathu Raja, which released in 2019 after beginning production in 2017. In 2019, he participated as a contestant in Bigg Boss Telugu 3 and became 2nd Runner up.

Films

As a choreographer

As an actor

As a director

Television shows and appearances

Awards and nominations

References

External links 

Indian film choreographers
Tamil film directors
Film directors from Chennai
Living people
Artists from Chennai
21st-century Indian dancers
1981 births
Indian male dancers
Dancers from Tamil Nadu
Filmfare Awards winners
Indian choreographers